He Zihao (born 30 May 1994) is a Chinese Paralympic archer. He won the gold medal in the men's individual compound open event at the 2020 Summer Paralympics held in Tokyo, Japan. He also won the gold medal in the team compound open event.

References 

Living people
1994 births
Chinese male archers
Paralympic archers of China
Paralympic gold medalists for China
Paralympic medalists in archery
Archers at the 2020 Summer Paralympics
Medalists at the 2020 Summer Paralympics
Sportspeople from Beijing
21st-century Chinese people